Habo Wolley is a volleyball club in Habo in Sweden, established in 1987. The men's team qualified for the Swedish top division, Elitserien, in 1998.

References

External links
Official website 

1987 establishments in Sweden
Swedish volleyball clubs
Volleyball clubs established in 1987
Habo